Cape Umoya United Football Club was a South African football club based in Cape Town, South Africa. They were established in 2018 following the takeover of defunct, former PSL team, Platinum Stars F.C.

Platinum Stars were relegated from the 2017-2018 PSL season, and Cape Umoya spent their three seasons in the National First Division.

The club ceased to exist after selling its franchise to Robinson Ramaite in June 2021, who moved it to Venda, forming Venda F.C.

Seasons 
 2018–19 National First Division - 10th
 2019–20 National First Division - 11th
 2020–21 National First Division - 7th

References 

Association football clubs established in 2018
2018 establishments in South Africa
National First Division clubs
Soccer clubs in Cape Town